Rosalyn Doris Fairbank-Nideffer (born 2 November 1960) is a retired professional tennis player from South Africa. She played her first grand slam in 1979, with her last appearance in 1997. She won a WTA Tour singles event in Richmond in 1983 and numerous doubles titles, with the highlight being her Grand Slam titles at the 1981 French Open with Tanya Harford and 1983 with Candy Reynolds. She won 317 singles and 472 doubles matches on the tour during her career.

Grand Slam finals

Doubles: 3 (2 titles, 1 runner-up)

Mixed doubles: 1 (1 runner-up)

External links 
 
 
 

1960 births
South African people of British descent
Sportspeople from Durban
South African female tennis players
South African people of English descent
Living people
Grand Slam (tennis) champions in women's doubles
French Open champions
White South African people